The Urukh (romanized: Irӕf / Ӕrӕf), known as Kharves in its upper reaches, is a river in North Ossetia–Alania and Kabardino-Balkaria (Russia), which flows northeast to join the Terek as a left tributary northwest of Vladikavkaz. The length of the Urukh is 104 km, the area of its drainage basin is 1280 km². The Urukh originates in the glaciers of the Greater Caucasus. The river freezes up in December and remains icebound until March.

References 

Rivers of North Ossetia–Alania
Rivers of Kabardino-Balkaria